Tina Baz, (also credited as Tina Baz le Gal) is a Franco-Lebanese film editor. She edited Adolescentes which won her a 2021 César for best editing. She was nominated for best directing at the 2008 Hong Kong Film Awards.

She is notably a regular collaborator of Naomi Kawase and Sébastien Lifshitz.

Filmography 
 Around the Pink House (1999)
 Poetical Refugee (2001)
 Les Diables (2002)
 A Perfect Day (2005)
 Suely in the Sky (2006)
 Mad Detective (2007)
 Childhoods (2007)
 Our Forbidden Places (2008)
 Queen to Play 2009
 Written By 2009
 Hanezu 2011
 Elena 2012
 The Lebanese Rocket Society 2012
 Still the Water 2014
 Looking for Her 2015

Further reading

References 

French people of Lebanese descent
French women film directors
Living people
Year of birth missing (living people)